Furcula modesta, the modest furcula or modest kitten, is a species of moth in the family Notodontidae (the prominents). It was first described by Hudson in 1891 and it is found in North America.

The MONA or Hodges number for Furcula modesta is 7941.

References

Further reading

 
 
 

Notodontidae
Articles created by Qbugbot
Moths described in 1891